Sancho Ochoa de Castro (alternately Sancho Ochoa de Chinchetru) was a Spanish soldier who served as governor and captain general of Puerto Rico in the first decade of the 17th century.

It is certain that a Sancho Ochoa was governor of the island of Puerto Rico in the second half of the 16th century and the beginning of the 17th century. However, there is disagreement on both the second surname and the place of birth. The Basque Encyclopedia (Auñamendi, 1999) states that a Sancho Ochoa de Chinchetru was the governor and captain general of the island of San Juan de Puerto Rico and that, likewise, he was the mayor of the capital and its fortress. Ochoa de Chinchetru was born in Salvatierra (Álava) and died in 1604 after being named Viceroy of Navarre.

A Sancho Ochoa de Castro appears as governor of the island in the first quarter of the 17th century and warden of the fortress of San Juan de Puerto Rico. He made several renovations to the Castillo San Felipe del Morro. When it was decided to secure the city of San Juan and fortify it, Sancho Ochoa de Castro built the trenches of the Puntilla de San Lázaro, designed by Diego Menéndez Valdés.

Ochoa de Castro is also known for sending a detachment of troops to Hispaniola to assist in the enforcement of the royal order known as the Devastations of Osorio.

References

History of Puerto Rico